Kerr  is a Scottish surname. See Clan Kerr for the Scottish origins.

Notable people with the surname include:

A
 Alan Kerr (born 1964), Canadian ice hockey player
 Alex Kerr (disambiguation), several people
Alexander Kerr (1892–1964), English marine engineer on the Endurance
 Alexander Kerr (banker) (1838–1909), Scottish banker
 Alexander Kerr (professor), the Linda and Jack Gill Chair in Music at Jacobs School of Music, Indiana University
 Alexander Robert Kerr (1770–1831), Royal Navy officer
 Alfred Kerr (1867–1948), German journalist, critic and writer
 Alice Forgy Kerr (born 1954), American politician from Kentucky
 Allen Kerr (politician) (born 1956), member of the Arkansas House of Representatives
 Amabel Kerr (1846-1906), British writer
 Andrew Kerr (disambiguation), several people
 Angus W. Kerr (1873–1927), American politician
 Anita Kerr (1927–2022), American singer and arranger
 Archibald John Kerr Clark Kerr, 1st Baron Inverchapel (1882–1951), British diplomat
 Arthur Francis George Kerr (1877–1942), Irish medical doctor and botanist
 Austin Kerr (born 1989), member of American rock band Set It Off

B
 Baine Kerr (1919–2008), American lawyer
 Barbara Kerr, Canadian equestrian 
 Beatrice Kerr (1887–1971), Australian swimmer and diver
 Ben Kerr (1930–2005), Canadian broadcaster, and musician
 Bill Kerr (1922–2014), Australian actor
 Brian Kerr (disambiguation), several people
 Brook Kerr (born 1973), American actress

C
 Charles Kerr (disambiguation), several people
 Clark Kerr (1911–2003), American professor of economics, academic administrator (first Chancellor of the University of California, Berkeley)
 Cristie Kerr (born 1977), American golfer

D
 Daniel Kerr (born 1983), Australian rules footballer (son of Australian rules footballer Roger Kerr and brother of Samantha "Sam" Kerr)
 Daniel Kerr (politician) (1836–1916), American politician
 David Kerr (disambiguation), several people
 Deborah Kerr (1921–2007), British film and television actress
 Deborah Kerr (canoeist) (born 1997), Scottish canoeist
 Dickey Kerr (1893–1963), American baseball player
 Don Kerr, Canadian musician and record producer
 Donald Kerr (born 1939), American intelligence officer
 Donald M. Kerr (conservationist) (1946–2015), American biologist and museum founder
 Douglas Kerr (born 1951), British writer and literary academic
 Duncan Kerr (born 1952), Australian judge

E
 Edward Kerr (born 1966), American actor
 Elizabeth Kerr, American actress
 Estelle Muriel Kerr (1879–1971), Canadian painter, illustrator and writer

F
 Fergus Kerr (born 1931), Scottish Roman Catholic priest and scholar
 Frank John Kerr (1918–2000), Australian astronomer and physicist
 Frank Kerr (footballer) (1889–1977)
 Frederick Kerr (1858–1933), English actor

G
 Gavin Kerr (born 1977), British rugby union footballer
 George Kerr (disambiguation), multiple people
 Gordon Kerr (disambiguation), multiple people
 Graham Kerr (born 1934), British cooking personality
 Greg Kerr (born 1947), Canadian politician

H
 Sir Hamilton Kerr, 1st Baronet (1903–1974), British politician
 Hugh Kerr (born 1944), Scottish politician and social policy expert

I
 Ian Mackenzie-Kerr (1929–2005), British book designer
 Imp Kerr (born 1980), Swedish-French artist

J
 Jack Kerr (cricketer) (1910–2007), New Zealand cricketer
 Jack Kerr (ice hockey) (1863–1933), Canadian ice hockey player
 James/Jim Kerr, several people
 Jane Kerr (born 1968), Canadian competitive swimmer
 Jasper Kerr (1898–1986), Scottish footballer
 Jean Kerr (1922–2003), American author and playwright
 Jerry Kerr (1912–1999), Scottish footballer
 John Kerr (disambiguation), several people
 Johnny Kerr (1932–2009), American basketball player, coach, executive, and broadcaster
 Josiah Kerr (1861–1920), American politician
 Joseph Kerr (1765–1837), American politician
 Joseph Kerr (Canadian politician) (died 1902), merchant and politician from Ontario
 Joseph Kerr (Wisconsin politician) (died 1855), American politician
 Josh Kerr (rugby league) (born 1996), Australian rugby league player
 Josh Kerr (runner) (born 1997), British middle-distance runner
 Judith Kerr (1923–2019), German-born British writer and illustrator

K
 Katharine Kerr (born 1944), American science fiction and fantasy novelist
 Kevin Kerr (disambiguation), several people

M
 Malcolm H. Kerr (1931–1984), American academic (see also his father Stanley Kerr and son Steve Kerr)
 Malcolm Kerr (politician) (born 1950), Australian politician
 Mark Kerr (disambiguation), several people
 Martin Kerr, American neo-Nazi, commander of the New Order of the American Nazi Party
 M.E. Kerr, a pseudonym used by Marijane Meaker (born 1927), American novelist and short story writer
 Mel Kerr (1903–1980), Canadian baseball player
 Michael Kerr (disambiguation), several people
 Miranda Kerr (born 1983), Australian model

N
 Nancy Kerr (born 1975), English folk musician
 Nancy Kerr (born 1947), Canadian curler

O
 Orin Kerr (born 1971), American lawyer and scholar

P
 Patrick Kerr (born 1956), American actor
 Paul Kerr (born 1964), English footballer
 Peg Kerr, American fantasy genre author
 Peter Kerr (disambiguation)
 Philip Kerr (1953–2018), British author
 Philip Kerr, 11th Marquess of Lothian (1882–1940), British politician, diplomat, and newspaper editor

R
 Ralph Kerr (1891–1941), British Royal Navy captain of HMS Hood
 Ray Kerr (born 1994), American baseball player
 Robbie Kerr (born 1971), British race car driver
 Robbie Kerr (Australian cricketer) (born 1961), Australian cricket player
 Robert Kerr (disambiguation), several people
 Roger Kerr (1945–2011), New Zealand businessman
 Roger Kerr (footballer) (born 1960), India-born Australian rules footballer (father of Daniel and Sam Kerr)
 Ronan Kerr (?–2011), murdered Northern Irish police constable
 Ronnie Kerr (born 1974), American actor
 Rowan Rait Kerr (1891–1961), Irish cricketer and administrator
 Roy Kerr (born 1934), New Zealand mathematician

S
 Samantha Kerr (born 1993), Australian soccer player (respectively the daughter and sister of footballers Roger Kerr and Daniel Kerr)
 Schomberg Henry Kerr, 9th Marquess of Lothian (1833–1900), British diplomat and politician
 Scott Kerr (born 1981), English footballer
 Shelley Kerr (born 1969), Scottish footballer and football manager
 Sinead Kerr (born 1978), Scottish ice dancer
 Sophie Kerr (1880–1965), American writer
 Stanley Kerr (1894–1976), American humanitarian, clinical biochemist and educator (father of academic Malcolm Kerr and grandfather of Steve Kerr)
 Stephen Kerr (born 1960), British politician
 Steve Kerr (born 1965), American basketball player, broadcaster, executive, and coach (son of academic Malcolm Kerr and grandson of Stanley Kerr)
 Stu Kerr (1928–1994), American television personality

T
 Tim Kerr (born 1960), Canadian professional ice hockey player

V
 Vernon Kerr (1928–2020), American politician

W
 Lord Walter Kerr (1839–1927), Scottish officer in the British Royal Navy
 Walter Kerr (1913–1996), American writer and theater critic
 Warwick Estevam Kerr (1922–2018), Brazilian agricultural engineer, geneticist, entomologist, and professor
 Wayne Kerr (born 1985), Irish rugby league player
 William Kerr (disambiguation), numerous people
 William Alexander Kerr (1831–1919), Scottish lieutenant in the 24th Bombay Native Infantry
 William G. Kerr, mayor of Hamilton, Ontario in 1853
 William Johnson Kerr (1787–1845), Canadian military and political leader
 W. Rolfe Kerr (born 1935), American religious leader in the Church of Jesus Christ of Latter-day Saints

See also 

 Ker (surname)

Anglicised Scottish Gaelic-language surnames
Surnames of Scottish origin
Scottish surnames